The 2012 Pennsylvania 400 was a NASCAR Sprint Cup Series stock car race held on August 5, 2012 at the Pocono Raceway in Long Pond, Pennsylvania. Contested over 98 laps of 160, it was the twenty-first race of the 2012 NASCAR Sprint Cup Series season. On August 10, 2011, track president Brandon Igdalsky announced that the race will be shortened from 500 miles to 400 miles. Jeff Gordon, from the Hendrick Motorsports racing team, won his first race of the season while Kasey Kahne finished second. Martin Truex Jr. clinched the third position. The win gave Gordon his first of the 2012 season, as well as his sixth at the track, the most at Pocono, breaking a tie with Bill Elliott, and has since been tied by Denny Hamlin.

The race was marred by a lightning strike which killed a spectator and injured nine others as Gordon was on his way to victory lane. The race was not red flagged (suspended) until rain hit the race track after 98 laps, 42 minutes after thunderstorm warnings were issued. The incident led to stringent policy standards for Automobile Competition Committee for the United States members (including NASCAR, IndyCar, IMSA and NHRA) regarding lightning around racing venues.

Report

Background

Pocono Raceway is one of  six  superspeedways to hold NASCAR races, the others being Daytona International Speedway, Michigan International Speedway, Auto Club Speedway, Indianapolis Motor Speedway and Talladega Superspeedway. The track's turns are banked differently; the first is banked at 14°, the second turn at 8° and the final turn with 6°. However, each of the three straightaways are banked at 2°. Brad Keselowski was the defending race winner.

Before the race, Dale Earnhardt Jr. led the Drivers' Championship with 731 points, and Matt Kenseth stood in second with 717. Greg Biffle was third in the Drivers' Championship with 709 points, five ahead of Jimmie Johnson and 42 ahead of Denny Hamlin in fourth and fifth. Kevin Harvick with 653 was even with Martin Truex Jr., as Tony Stewart with 652 points, was three ahead of Brad Keselowski, and  nine in front of Clint Bowyer. In the Manufacturers' Championship, Chevrolet was leading with144 points, 28 ahead of Toyota. Ford, with 97 points, was fourteen points ahead of Dodge in the battle for third.

Practice and qualifying

Two practice sessions were held before the race on August 3, 2012. The first and second session were each 90 minutes long. Johnson was quickest with a time of 51.638 seconds in the first session, 0.088 faster than Kyle Busch. Carl Edwards was third quickest, followed by Kenseth, Biffle, and Kasey Kahne. Joey Logano was seventh, still within a three-tenths of a second of Johnson's time. Shortly before the first session concluded, Paul Menard sustained major damages to his car after crashing, causing the team to use their replacement car. In the second and final practice session, Earnhardt Jr. was quickest with a time of 50.721 seconds. Kenseth with a time of 50.855, was second quickest, ahead of Biffle, Kyle Busch, and Edwards. Jamie McMurray, Truex Jr., Jeff Gordon, Kurt Busch, and Johnson completed the first ten positions.

Forty-four cars were entered for qualifying, but only forty-three could qualify for the race because of NASCAR's qualifying procedure. Juan Pablo Montoya clinched his eighth pole position of his career, with a time of 51.124 seconds. He was joined on the front row of the grid by Hamlin. Menard qualified third, Kahne took fourth, and Marcos Ambrose started fifth. Kurt Busch, Kenseth, Earnhardt Jr., Ryan Newman and Johnson rounded out the top ten. The driver that failed to qualify for the race was Stephen Leicht.

Once the qualifying session had concluded, Montoya stated, "I know (Sunday) is going to be a reality check that we've still got to work on it a lot. But the race hasn't even started, and we haven't seen how the car works in clean air. We know there's a lot of really strong cars, but you make the right strategy and if you get track position, we've shown we've got the speed. I'm really open-minded. I told people, 'Let's enjoy today.' "

Race
The race started 90 minutes late due to a rain delay. The first ten laps of the race featured two lead changes and four others as Denny Hamlin and pole-sitter Juan Pablo Montoya repassed each other four times in two laps. Dale Earnhardt Jr. was also in contention for the lead before his transmission broke, and Jimmie Johnson led the most laps, but would crash on a restart with Matt Kenseth and Hamlin in Turn 1 on Lap 91. Jeff Gordon, who was running fifth on the restart avoided the crash, and would become the new leader. Seven laps later under caution, the thunderstorm hit the track and after 98 of the scheduled 160 laps, giving Gordon his 86th career Sprint Cup win. Kasey Kahne came in second, and his contentions in the race were dashed in pit road during the final caution, when he ran over an air hose and had a flat right-rear tire.

Results

Qualifying

Race results

Standings after the race

Drivers' Championship standings

Manufacturers' Championship standings

Note: Only the top five positions are included for the driver standings.

Lightning strikes
After the race, a spectator was killed by a lightning strike, while nine others (one critical) were injured. The nine injured spectators were taken to area hospitals, and five of them were later taken to local hospitals for examination. The track had tweeted for fans to "seek shelter as severe lightning and heavy winds are in our area", and the fans were instructed by public address systems at the track to take cover. However, fans posted on the track's Facebook page that they could not hear the warnings, and a fan tweeted to the Associated Press that the noise levels at races are so loud that little could hear the public address system. The race wasn't called until 42 minutes after the warning, leading to questions over whether or not NASCAR should have ended the race earlier or stopped the race prior to Lap 81 (which would have led to a Monday morning resumption of the race as less than half distance was reached). Race winner Jeff Gordon stated that he had heard a crack while he was on pit road.

The victim, 41-year-old Brian Zimmerman from Moosic, Pennsylvania, was standing next to his car at the track's parking lot behind the Turn 3 grandstand. Bystanders had attempted to perform CPR on him until paramedics arrived. Zimmerman was later taken to the track's medical facility, and was pronounced dead at a local hospital at 6:11 pm. The victim that was in critical condition after getting struck was later in stable condition on August 6.

The American flag at the track was flown at half-mast the morning after the race. Pocono Raceway later established the "Pennsylvania 400 Memorial Fund" to help benefit the victims of the strikes.

On August 5, 2014, Zimmerman's wife sued NASCAR, seeking damages for negligence and wrongful death.

As a result, ACCUS-FIA, the governing body on motorsport in the United States that consists of the major motorsport sanctioning bodies (NASCAR, INDYCAR, IMSA, NHRA, SCCA, USAC, WKA), has adopted rules on lightning consistent with other sporting events.  This applies to all motorsport in the United States governed by ACCUS-FIA members.  If, at any time, weather radar detects lightning inside a 13 kilometer (eight mile) radius of the venue, spectator warnings are immediately delivered to clear the grandstands by public address system and video boards at the circuit.   The race is immediately suspended, with a 30-minute suspension clock starting immediately.  The safety car is deployed and leads the field to pit lane, with an immediate red flag.  All race marshals are immediately sent indoors to a safe area, most transported by safety trucks.  Teams then cover cars (removing electrical equipment) with drivers and crews (including media) headed to an indoor media centre.  For each lightning strike inside the radius (marked on the weather radar), the 30-minute clock is reset.  Activity may not resume until the 13 km area suffers no lightning strikes for 30 consecutive minutes.

During the 2014 INDYCAR Barber round, the event was delayed and shortened because of lighting before the 3 PM CT start.  At the Detroit INDYCAR Race 1 in 2015, the race ended because of lightning.  At the 2017 IMSA Road America round for the Continental Tire Sports Car Challenge, the two-hour race ended at 1:20 because of lightning.  At NASCAR's 2017 Brantley Gilbert Big Machine 400, the lightning policy was implemented on Lap 12.  Twice in consecutive weeks during the 2019 season (Joliet and Daytona July), the lightning policy was implemented.  The safety car was called on Lap 11 at Joliet and a restart was aborted on Lap 128 at Daytona because of lightning, leading to long delays caused by lightning.  The Joliet race was suspended for more than three hours, while the Daytona race ended abruptly because of lightning and later rain.  INDYCAR also called a lightning delay in 2019 at Detroit, where the race was shortened to 1 hour, 15 minutes after severe lightning delayed the start.  Lightning also ended that season's Pocono round after 128 laps.

References

External links
 NASCAR page

NASCAR races at Pocono Raceway
Pennsylvania 400
Pennsylvania 400
Brickyard 400
NASCAR controversies